Sauerwein is a German surname, 'sauer' means 'sour'. Notable people with the surname include:

Elinor Sauerwein (1914–2010), American philanthropist
Frank Paul Sauerwein (1871–1910), American painter
Georg Sauerwein (1831–1904), German publisher, polyglot, poet, and linguist

German-language surnames